The table tennis competition at the 2019 Games of the Small States of Europe was held from 28 May to 1 June 2019 at the Dvorana Župa Tivat in Tivat.

Medal summary

Medal table

Medalists

References 

Games of the Small States of Europe
2019 Games of the Small States of Europe
2019
Table tennis in Montenegro
Tivat